US-Bangla Airlines is a privately owned Bangladeshi airline headquartered in Dhaka and based at Shahjalal International Airport under the umbrella companies of US-Bangla Group.
The airline is the largest private airline in Bangladesh in terms of fleet size and overall second largest airline after the flag carrier Biman Bangladesh Airlines. Though Airlines is the flagship company of the parent US-Bangla Group, it owns numerous businesses in other industries such as real estate, education, media, electronics, consumer foods.

History
US-Bangla Airlines commenced operations with domestic flights on 17 July 2014. Initially, the airline launched two domestic destinations, Chittagong and Jessore from its hub in Dhaka. Flights to Cox's Bazar from Dhaka were launched in August. In October, the airline launched flights to Saidpur.

In July 2016, the airline announced plans to phase in its first three Boeing 737-800 aircraft in September of the same year, and to subsequently launch new international routes, for example to Singapore and Dubai.
On 29 April 2019, the airline started flights to Guangzhou, becoming the first Bangladeshi airline to operate flights to China.
The airline started flights from Dhaka to Chennai (via Chittagong) on 31 March 2019 also becoming first Bangladeshi airline carrier to operate flights to Southern India.

In February 2019, US-Bangla Airlines announced an order for four ATR 72-600 aircraft, to be used on domestic flights. On 22 March 2019, the first aircraft was delivered from Toulouse to Dhaka via El Dabaa and Muscat.

In September 2019, US-Bangla Airlines become the second largest airline after Biman Bangladesh Airlines, in Bangladesh in terms of fleet size.

The airline was supposed to start direct flights from Sylhet to other Bangladeshi cities such as Chittagong, Cox's Bazar and Jessore, as well as a flight from Chittagong to Jessore, in order to make the city of Sylhet more accessible, from mid 2020.

The airline also announced its plans to add four more international routes to Abu Dhabi, Colombo and Malé in the beginning of 2021. However the plan was hit by COVID-19 pandemic.

Plan of expansion
In November 2021, a senior authority of the airline expressed the plan of expansion of the airlines for both of its destinations fleets, as the airline is willing to add seven new international routes, i.e. Jeddah, Dammam, Medina, Riyadh, Sharjah, Abu Dhabi, Kuwait, Colombo, Sydney, New Delhi, Hyderabad etc. from Dhaka.
The airline also planning to introduce Dhaka–New York flight in 2023, if Bangladesh earn Civil Aviation Category–I by 2022. Subsequently, few destinations in Europe, i.e. London, Paris, Amsterdam and Rome are being planned to be introduced by 2023. The airline will also add 06-08 widebody aircraft to its fleet by 2023.

Corporate affairs
Its headquarters are in the Baridhara Diplomatic Zone in Dhaka.

Destinations

As of February 2021, US-Bangla Airlines serves the following domestic and international destinations: The airline started flights to Dubai–International on 1 February 2021, which is its tenth international destination.

Fleet
As of November 2022 , US-Bangla Airlines fleet consists of the following aircraft:

Accidents and incidents

Flight 211

On 12 March 2018, US-Bangla Airlines Flight 211, a Bombardier Dash 8 Q-402 with registration S2-AGU, crashed while landing at Tribhuvan International Airport, killing 51 of the 71 people on board.  The final accident report, published on 27 January 2019, concluded that "the probable cause of the accident is due to disorientation and a complete loss of situational awareness in the part of [a] crewmember".

Other incidents
On 26 September 2018, US-Bangla Airlines Flight 141, a Boeing 737-800 with registration S2-AJA, took off from Dhaka airport at 11:30 am with 164 passengers and seven crew members on board. It was scheduled to land at the Cox's Bazar Airport at 12:30 pm. On approach to Cox's Bazar, the nose-wheel mechanism jammed and prevented the wheel hatch from opening. The pilot then put the Boeing 737-800 into a holding pattern over Chattogram to burn off fuel so that it would be lighter and the risk of fire on impact would be reduced. The plane eventually touched down at 1:18 pm. Some passengers received minor injuries as they attempted to disembark the aircraft hurriedly. This incident was very similar to JetBlue Flight 292

Other industries under US-Bangla Group
Though US-Bangla Airlines is the flagship company of the conglomerate, it is arguably one of the fastest rising conglomerates in Bangladesh. It rebranded its current name from US-Bangla Assets in 2009. Its other notable business is real estate company US-Bangla asset which is developing Purbachal American City, one of largest commercial and residential real estate projects in Bangladesh. The group now owns educational businesses such as Green University of Bangladesh, one of the earliest private universities of Bangladesh, and US-Bangla Medical College and Hospital. The group also owns leather company in Bangladesh namely US-Bangla Leather which has bit yet started its production. Other than that it owns US-Bangla Hi-tech Industries which is also yet to set up. It has its footing in Media businesses through US-Bangla Media and Communications

See also
 List of airlines of Bangladesh
 List of companies of Bangladesh
 Transport in Bangladesh

References

External links

 
 US-Bangla Group website: 

Airlines of Bangladesh
Airlines established in 2013
Bangladeshi companies established in 2013